Mitzie Collins (born August 29, 1941) is an interpreter of traditional British and American vocal and instrumental music.

She has arranged songs, including Genesee County waltzes. Collins is a player of the dulcimer and other instruments, including the piano, organ, harpsichord, and banjo. As a recording and concert artist, she is best known for playing traditional music for the hammered dulcimer. She is also one of the directors of the Striking Strings Hammered Dulcimer Ensemble, a large ensemble consisting entirely of hammered dulcimerists, who perform around Western New York. Some of her many albums are Ornaments—Music for Christmas, Be Thou My Vision—Favorite Hymns for Dulcimer and St. Patrick's Day in the Morning—Music of Irish Inspiration.

For ten years, Collins hosted Sounds Like Fun, a children's radio show on WXXI-FM in Rochester, New York. Collins is president of Sampler Records Ltd. in Rochester, New York. She is also on the faculty of the Eastman School of Music, and she teaches several classes, including hammered dulcimer classes, at the Eastman Community Music School.

Discography
Sounds Like Fun (folk songs, games, and poems for children)
Scotland the Brave
St. Patrick's Day in the Morning (with Roxanne Ziegler)
White Dulcimer Christmas
Nowell (with Roxanne Ziegler and Glennda Dove)
Ornaments (with Roxanne Ziegler)
Rejoice (with Roxanne Ziegler and Glennda Dove)
By Thou My Vision (with Esther Kreek, Kinloch Nelson, and Glennda Dove)
Traditional Irish Music (with William Sullivan)

References

External links
 Faculty profile (Nazareth College)
 Sampler Folk Music
 

Hammered dulcimer players
Old-time musicians
Eastman School of Music alumni
Living people
1941 births